Weber Shandwick is a marketing communications firm formed in 2001 by merging the Weber Group, Shandwick International and BSMG. The company is part of global agency network Interpublic Group (IPG), as part of the parent company's IPG DXTRA operating division.

History

Shandwick International, founded in 1974, was acquired by IPG in 1998. In September 2000, IPG announced it was merging Shandwick with IPG's Weber Group, itself founded in 1974, to form Weber Shandwick. The merger was completed on 1 January 2001, and in October, BSMG (formerly Bozell Sawyer Miller Group), which had been acquired by IPG as part of IPG's March 2001 acquisition of True North, merged with Weber Shandwick. BSMG Chairman Jack Leslie was named Chairman of the new combined group, and CEO Harris Diamond became the group's CEO.

In 2010, Weber Shandwick's internal developers and social media teams created a social media crisis simulator called Firebell. 

In January 2012, after a Weber Shandwick executive moved to Hill & Knowlton, Weber Shandwick secured a restraining order after alleging the firm was taking their employees and clients. In May, the agency was appointed global agency of record for the Tokyo 2020 Olympics. In November, Andy Polansky was named CEO. 

In March 2013, Weber Shandwick launched MediaCo, a content marketing unit providing services to clients including native advertising and digital media buying.

In May 2014, the firm acquired a Sweden-based agency, Prime, and its business intelligence division, United Minds.

In October 2018, Weber Shandwick relaunched United Minds as a global management consultancy, combining the agency’s global Employee Engagement & Change Management practice with United Minds Sweden, the management consultancy within Prime Weber Shandwick. 

In July 2019, Gail Heimann was named President and CEO of Weber Shandwick, with Andy Polansky became the firm's Executive Chairman. 

In December 2020, the agency announced a permanent hybrid model for its workforce.

In May 2021, the United Minds consultancy and fellow IPG company KRC Research launched new diversity, equity, and inclusion (DE&I) research. United Minds also started a DE&I initiative called Code+ify, to help business leaders looking to improve their DE&I efforts. In June, Susan Howe was named President. In September, the firm partnered with AI-driven threat intelligence and detection platform Blackbird.AI to launch its Media Security Center, to help clients proactively identify and fight disinformation. In October, the firm announced that Chairman Jack Leslie was stepping down as chairman in March 2022.

In January 2022, it was announced that Andy Polansky, Weber Shandwick executive chairman and Interpublic Group Dxtra CEO, would retire in June 2022.

Operations
Weber Shandwick is based in New York City, and as of January 2022, listed offices in 67 cities worldwide, as well as other affiliate city offices in six continents. As of December 2021, Andy Polansky was Weber Shandwick's executive chairman, Jack Leslie was chairman, Gail Heimann served as the agency's CEO, and Susan Howe was the agency's president. 

The agency and the eight sub-brands Cappuccino, Flipside, KRC Research, Powell Tate, Prime, Resolute, Revive Health, That Lot, and United Minds make up the Weber Shandwick Collective, within Interpublic Group's IPG DXTRA division, formerly known as IPG's Constituency Management Group.

The agency also does work as 3PM, a dedicated holding company group formed with fellow IPG company PMK-BNC to coordinate efforts for multinational brewing company InBev, primarily with the beer brands Bud and Bud Light.

Research
The agency also performs surveys and releases research reports highlighting business trends. The reports include: 

 A February 2018 report identifying the growing trend of "buycotts", a form of consumer activism whereby consumers buy from good companies to show support. 
 A November 2018 study of CEO activism along with involvement in politics, and its influence on government action.
 A 2019 study of company chief diversity officers identifying the challenges and benefits of pursuing DE&I initiatives.
 December 2020 employee activism research performed in conjunction with Weber Shandwick's United Minds consultancy.
 May 2021 DE&I research done by the United Minds consultancy and fellow IPG company KRC Research.
 An August 2021 report on geopolitics and major implications for corporate risk. (Fortune)

References

External links

Marketing companies established in 2001
Public relations companies of the United States
Companies based in New York City
Interpublic Group
Marketing companies